Casiri (possibly from Aymara for bawler, is a mountain in the Andes of Peru, about  high. It is located in the Arequipa Region, Castilla Province, on the border of the districts of Chachas and Choco. Casiri lies in the western part of the Chila mountain range in the Arequipa Region, south of Chila, Choquepirhua and Yuraccacsa, and northeast of Cerani.

References

Mountains of Peru
Mountains of Arequipa Region